Sam Robertson (born February 2, 1943) is an American  former college football coach. He served as the defensive coordinator for the Texas Tech Red Raiders during the 1978 and 1979 seasons under head coach Rex Dockery. Robertson left Texas Tech after he was named head coach of the Southwestern Louisiana Ragin' Cajuns. While head coach at Southwestern Louisiana (now the University of Louisiana at Lafayette), Robertson compiled a record of 29–34–2 from 1980 to 1985.

Since leaving coaching in the 1980s, Robertson has become a real estate agent in Lafayette, Louisiana, owning Sam Robertson Real Estate Co.

Head coaching record

References

External links
 Sam Robertson at College Football at Sports-Reference.com

1943 births
Living people
American football linebackers
Kansas State Wildcats football coaches
Louisiana Ragin' Cajuns football coaches
Oregon Ducks football coaches
Tennessee Volunteers football coaches
Tennessee Volunteers football players
Texas Tech Red Raiders football coaches